Harold Boyd (2 February 1913 – 25 April 1971) was an  Australian rules footballer who played with Fitzroy in the Victorian Football League (VFL).

Notes

External links 
		

1913 births
1971 deaths
Australian rules footballers from Victoria (Australia)
Fitzroy Football Club players